A variety of units of measurement were used in Colombia to measure quantities like length, mass and area.  In Colombia, International Metric System has adopted since 1853, and has been compulsory since 1854.

Pre-metric units

Several different units were used before 1854.  Older system before Metric system was derived from Spanish Castillian System.

Length

Different units were used to measure length.  As in 1920s too, some units were derived from metric system.  One vara was equal to 0.8 m (or 0.84 m).  Some other units are provided below:

1 pulgada =  vara

1 cuarta =  vara

1 pie =  vara

1 cuadra = 100 varas

1 legua = 6250 varas

Mass

A number of units were used to measure mass.  As in 1920s too, some units were derived from the metric system.  One libra was equal to 0.500 kg (i.e. 500 g) (or 0.54354 kg).  Some other units are provided below:

1 onza =  libra

1 arroba = 25 libra

1 quintal = 100 libra

1 saco = 125 libra

1 carga = 250 libra

1 tonelada = 2000 libra

Area

Several units were used to measure area.  As in 1920s too, some units were derived from metric system. one vara2 was equal to 0.64 m2, and one fanegada was equal to 10,000 vara2

References

Colombian culture
Colombia